The 2022 Oregon State Beavers softball team represented Oregon State University in the 2022 NCAA Division I softball season as members of the Pac-12 Conference. The Beavers were led by head coach Laura Berg in her tenth season and played their home games at Kelly Field.

Roster

Coaches

Schedule and results

! style=""| Regular season
|- valign="top"

|-bgcolor=ffbbbb
| Feb 11 || vs. * ||  || Hillenbrand Stadium • Tucson, AZ || 2–3 || Linton (1–0) || Mazon (0–1) || – || 0–1 || –
|-bgcolor=bbffbb
| Feb 12 || vs. * ||  || Hillenbrand Stadium • Tucson, AZ || 8–06 || Stepto (1–0) || Winston (0–3) || – || 1–1 || –
|-bgcolor=ffbbbb
| Feb 12 || vs. No. 2 * ||  || Hillenbrand Stadium • Tucson, AZ || 1–5 || Fouts (1–0) || Mazon (0–2) || – || 1–2 || –
|-bgcolor=bbffbb
| Feb 13 || vs. Texas State* ||  || NM State Softball Complex • Las Cruces, NM || 6–1 || Mazon (1–2) || Mullins (1–1) || – || 2–2 || –
|-bgcolor=bbffbb
| Feb 13 || vs. * ||  || NM State Softball Complex • Las Cruces, NM || 12–05 || Haendiges (1–0) || De La Torre (0–2) || – || 3–2 || –
|-bgcolor=ffbbbb
| Feb 18 || vs. * ||  || USD Softball Complex • San Diego, CA || 1–28 || Knische (2–1) || Mazon (1–3) || – || 3–3 || –
|-bgcolor=bbffbb
| Feb 18 || vs. * ||  || USD Softball Complex • San Diego, CA || 1–0 || Stepto (2–0) || Hilderbrand (0–3) || Haendiges (1) || 4–3 || –
|-bgcolor=bbffbb
| Feb 19 || vs. * || || USD Softball Complex • San Diego, CA || 10–05 || Haendiges (2–0) || Lehman (2–2) || – || 5–3 || –
|-bgcolor=bbffbb
| Feb 20 || at * || || USD Softball Complex • San Diego, CA || 7–2 || Mazon (2–3) || Vasquez (3–2) || – || 6–3 || –
|-bgcolor=bbffbb
| Feb 20 || vs. * || || USD Softball Complex • San Diego, CA || 8–1 || Stepto (3–0) || Rose (2–1) || – || 7–3 || –
|-bgcolor=bbffbb
| Feb 25 || vs. No. 17 * || || Big League Dreams Complex • Cathedral City, CA || 5–2 || Mazon (3–3) || Rogers (3–1) || – || 8–3 || –
|-bgcolor=bbffbb
| Feb 25 || vs. * || || Big League Dreams Complex • Cathedral City, CA || 13–7 || Mazon (4–3) || Orme (0–1) || – || 9–3 || –
|-bgcolor=bbffbb
| Feb 26 || vs. * || || Big League Dreams Complex • Cathedral City, CA || 6–0 || Mazon (5–3) || Martinez (0–1) || – || 10–3 || –
|-bgcolor=bbffbb
| Feb 26 || vs. * || || Big League Dreams Complex • Cathedral City, CA || 19–05 || Haendiges (3–0) || Winston (1–11) || – || 11–3 || –
|-bgcolor=bbffbb
| Feb 27 || vs. * || || Big League Dreams Complex • Cathedral City, CA || 2–0 || Stepto (4–0) || Simpson (3–3) || – || 12–3 || –
|-

|-bgcolor=bbffbb
| Mar 4 || vs. * || || Amy S Harrison Field • Riverside, CA || 8–06 || Stepto (5–0) || Lawton (2–3) || – || 13–3 || –
|-bgcolor=bbffbb
| Mar 4 || at UC Riverside* || || Amy S Harrison Field • Riverside, CA || 9–16 || Mazon (6–3) || Heinlin (2–2) || – || 14–3 || –
|-bgcolor=bbffbb
| Mar 5 || vs. CSUN* || || Amy S Harrison Field • Riverside, CA || 5–0 || Haendiges (4–0) || Jamerson (2–5) || – || 15–3 || –
|-bgcolor=bbffbb
| Mar 5 || at * || || Amy S Harrison Field • Riverside, CA || 7–0 || Mazon (7–3) || Schuring (1–1) || – || 16–3 || –
|-bgcolor=bbffbb
| Mar 6 || vs. North Dakota State* || || Amy S Harrison Field • Riverside, CA || 3–1 || Stepto (6–0) || Paige (6–2) || – || 17–3 || –
|-bgcolor=bbffbb
| Mar 7 || vs. * || || Kelly Field • Corvallis, OR || 8–06 || Mazon (8–3) || Vatakis (2–2) || – || 18–3 || –
|-bgcolor=bbffbb
| Mar 7 || vs. Robert Morris* || || Kelly Field • Corvallis, OR || 3–0 || Stepto (7–0) || Rhinehart (4–1) || – || 19–3 || –
|-bgcolor=bbffbb
| Mar 11 || vs. North Dakota State* || || Jane Sanders Stadium • Eugene, OR || 11–4 || Haendiges (5–0) || Schulz (2–3) || – || 20–3 || –
|-bgcolor=ffbbbb
| Mar 12 || vs. * || || Kelly Field • Corvallis, OR || 1–6 || Grey (10–1) || Stepto (7–1) || – || 20–4 || –
|-bgcolor=bbffbb
| Mar 12 || vs. Portland State* || || Kelly Field • Corvallis, OR || 9–1 || Haendiges (6–0) || Lemos (0–4) || – || 21–4 || –
|-bgcolor=bbffbb
| Mar 13 || vs. North Dakota State* || || Kelly Field • Corvallis, OR || 3–1 || Stepto (8–1) || Lainey (2–0) || – || 22–4 || –
|-bgcolor=ffbbbb
| Mar 18 || at No. 22 Arizona State || || Farrington Softball Stadium • Tempe, AZ || 3–5 || Morgan (10–1) || Stepto (8–2) || – || 22–5 || 0–1
|-bgcolor=ffbbbb
| Mar 19 || at No. 22 Arizona State || || Farrington Softball Stadium • Tempe, AZ || 1–9 || Schuld (7–2) || Haendiges (6–1) || – || 22–6 || 0–2
|-bgcolor=ffbbbb
| Mar 20 || at No. 22 Arizona State || || Farrington Softball Stadium • Tempe, AZ || 6–9 || Morgan (11–1) || Stepto (8–3) || – || 22–7 || 0–3
|-bgcolor=bbffbb
| Mar 21 || at * || || GCU Softball Stadium • Phoenix, AZ || 6–58 || Stepto (9–3) || Hambrick (8–5) || – || 23–7 || –
|-bgcolor=bbffbb
| Mar 25 || vs. No. 25  || || Kelly Field • Corvallis, OR || 1–0 || Haendiges (7–1) || Vawter (11–4) || – || 24–7 || 1–3
|-bgcolor=bbffbb
| Mar 26 || vs. No. 25 Stanford || || Kelly Field • Corvallis, OR || 4–1 || Mazon (9–3) || Krause (6–2) || – || 25–7 || 2–3
|-bgcolor=ffbbbb
| Mar 27 || vs. No. 25 Stanford || || Kelly Field • Corvallis, OR || 0–1 || Vawter (12–4) || Haendiges (7–2) || – || 25–8 || 2–4
|-bgcolor=bbffbb
| Mar 31 || at * || || Cottrell Field • Moraga, CA || 11–0 || Mazon (10–3) || Earle (6–5) || – || 26–8 || –
|-

|-bgcolor=bbffbb
| Apr 1 || at  || || Levine-Fricke Field • Berkeley, CA || 4–0 || Haendiges (8–2) || Archer (6–7) || – || 27–8 || 3–4
|-bgcolor=bbffbb
| Apr 2 || at California || || Levine-Fricke Field • Berkeley, CA || 8–06 || Mazon (11–3) || Teperson (1–3) || – || 28–8 || 4–4
|-bgcolor=bbffbb
| Apr 3 || at California || || Levine-Fricke Field • Berkeley, CA || 1–0 || Haendiges (9–2) || Halajian (13–4) || – || 29–8 || 5–4
|-bgcolor=bbffbb
| Apr 8 || vs. No. 20 Arizona || || Kelly Field • Corvallis, OR || 4–1 || Haendiges (10–2) || Bowen (7–6) || Mazon (1) || 30–8 || 6–4
|-bgcolor=bbffbb
| Apr 9 || vs. No. 20 Arizona || || Kelly Field • Corvallis, OR || 3–1 || Mazon (12–3) || Elish (4–3) || – || 31–8 || 7–4
|-bgcolor=ffbbbb
| Apr 10 || vs. No. 20 Arizona || || Kelly Field • Corvallis, OR || 1–95 || Bowen (8–6) || Haendiges (10–3) || – || 31–9 || 7–5
|-bgcolor=ffbbbb
| Apr 14 || at No. 15 Washington || || Husky Softball Stadium • Seattle, WA || 3–4 || Plain (10–4) || Mazon (12–4) || – || 31–10 || 7–6
|-bgcolor=ffbbbb
| Apr 15 || at No. 15 Washington || || Husky Softball Stadium • Seattle, WA || 1–2 || Lynch (4–3) || Haendiges (10–4) || – || 31–11 || 7–7
|-bgcolor=ffbbbb
| Apr 16 || at No. 15 Washington || || Husky Softball Stadium • Seattle, WA || 2–38 || Plain (11–4) || Mazon (12–5) || – || 31–12 || 7–8
|-bgcolor=ffbbbb
| Apr 22 || vs. No. 4 UCLA || || Kelly Field • Corvallis, OR || 5–6 || Azevedo (14–2) || Mazon (12–6) || Faraimo (4) || 31–13 || 7–9
|-bgcolor=ffbbbb
| Apr 23 || vs. No. 4 UCLA || || Kelly Field • Corvallis, OR || 2–3 || Azevedo (15–2) || Haendiges (10–5) || Faraimo (5) || 31–14 || 7–10
|-bgcolor=ffbbbb
| Apr 24 || vs. No. 4 UCLA || || Kelly Field • Corvallis, OR || 3–4 || Faraimo (16–1) || Mazon (12–7) || – || 31–15 || 7–11
|-bgcolor=ffbbbb
| Apr 29 || at No. 22 Oregon || || Jane Sanders Stadium • Eugene, OR || 0–55 || Hansen (11–7) || Mazon (12–8) ||  || 31–16 || 7–12
|-bgcolor=ffbbbb
| Apr 30 || at No. 22 Oregon || || Jane Sanders Stadium • Eugene, OR || 3–4 || Hansen (12–7) || Mazon (12–9) || – || 31–17 || 7–13
|-

|-bgcolor=ffbbbb
| May 1 || at No. 22 Oregon || || Jane Sanders Stadium • Eugene, OR || 2–4 || Kliethermes (8–5) || Mazon (12–10) || – || 31–18 || 7–14
|-bgcolor=bbffbb
| May 12 || vs.  || || Kelly Field • Corvallis, OR || 8–710 || Mazon (13–10) || Sandez (8–10) || – || 32–18 || 8–14
|-bgcolor=bbffbb
| May 13 || vs. Utah || || Kelly Field • Corvallis, OR || 3–1 || Mazon (14–10) || Sandez (8–11) || Haendiges (2) || 33–18 || 9–14
|-bgcolor=ffbbbb
| May 14 || vs. Utah || || Kelly Field • Corvallis, OR || 3–5 || Lopez (8–5) || Haendiges (10–6) || Smith (1) || 33–19 || 9–15
|-

! style="" | Postseason
|- valign="top"

|-bgcolor=bbffbb
| May 20 || vs. (2)  ||  || Lee Stadium • Knoxville, TN || 4–3 || Mazon (15–10) || Handley (22–10) || Haendiges (3) || 34–19 || 1–0
|-bgcolor=ffbbbb
| May 21 || vs. No. 13 (1) Tennessee || (3) || Lee Stadium • Knoxville, TN || 0–3 || Rogers (12–5) || Mazon (15–11) || – || 34–20 || 1–1
|-bgcolor=bbffbb
| May 21 || vs. (2) Ohio State || (3) || Lee Stadium • Knoxville, TN || 5–1 || Haendiges (11–6) || Handley (22–11) || – || 35–20 || 2–1
|-bgcolor=bbffbb
| May 22 || vs. No. 13 (1) Tennessee || (3) || Lee Stadium • Knoxville, TN || 8–3 || Mazon (16–11) || Rogers (12–6) || – || 36–20 || 3–1
|-bgcolor=bbffbb
| May 22 || vs. No. 13 (1) Tennessee || (3) || Lee Stadium • Knoxville, TN || 3–1 || Haendiges (12–6) || Edmoundson (19–8) || Mazon (2) || 37–20 || 4–1
|-

|-bgcolor=bbffbb
| May 27 || vs. Stanford ||  || Boyd & Jill Smith Family Stadium • Stanford, CA || 3–1 || Mazon (17–11) || Vawter (25–13) || – || 38–20 || 1–0
|-bgcolor=bbffbb
| May 28 || vs. Stanford ||  || Boyd & Jill Smith Family Stadium • Stanford, CA || 2–0 || Haendiges (13–6) || Vawter (25–14) || Mazon (3) || 39–20 || 2–0
|-

|-bgcolor=ffbbbb
| Jun 2 || vs. No. 12  || || USA Softball Hall of Fame Stadium • Oklahoma City, OK || 1–7 || Lugo (12–5) || Haendiges (13–7) || – || 39–21 || 0–1
|-bgcolor=ffbbbb
| Jun 3 || vs. Arizona || || USA Softball Hall of Fame Stadium • Oklahoma City, OK || 1–3 || Bowen (14–11) || Mazon''' (17–12) || – || 39–22 || 0–2
|-

|- style="text-align:center;"
|

Rankings

References

Oregon State
Oregon State Beavers softball
Oregon State Beavers softball seasons
Oregon State
Women's College World Series seasons